Sierra's 3-D Helicopter Simulator is a 1987 video game published by Sierra On-Line.

Gameplay
Sierra's 3-D Helicopter Simulator is a combat helicopter simulation in which head-to-head play is available via modem.

Reception
M. Evan Brooks reviewed the game for Computer Gaming World, and stated that "While 3-D Helicopter Simulator offers an interesting flight experience and a challenging two player modem game, the game is somewhat predictable as a solitaire combat simulator."

Reviews
ASM (Aktueller Software Markt) - Dec, 1987

References

External links
Review in Compute!

1987 video games
Combat flight simulators
DOS games
DOS-only games
Helicopter video games
Multiplayer video games
Sierra Entertainment games
Video games developed in the United States